Herbert Arthur Wiedoeft (22 November 1886 – 12 May 1928) was a German-American band leader in California in the 1920s.

Career
Wiedoeft was born in Germany and came to the United States with his parents as a child. Wiedoeft came from a family of gifted musicians and was encouraged by his father. His brothers Gerhardt and Adolph (nicknamed "Gay" and "Ad" respectively) played as sidemen in his band, Gerhardt on string bass and Adolph on percussion and xylophone. Another brother, Rudy Wiedoeft was a saxophone player during the late ragtime and early jazz era. Their sister, Erica, was a pianist. Herbert himself played the trumpet.

Wiedoeft started his first orchestra before 1915. His band played for several years at the Cinderella Roof Ballroom at Sixth and Olive in downtown Los Angeles. The band's theme song "Cinderella Blues" came from the name of this venue. The band recorded four songs for the Nordskog label in 1922.
The band gained a recording contract with Brunswick Records, toured in Chicago and New York and earned a national reputation. Their first record for Brunswick was "Cinderella Blues"/ "Shine", the latter being the first recording of the song that had Lew Brown's revised lyrics.
Clyde Lucas, who went on to form his own popular band in the 1930s and 1940s, started out as a singer and trombonist in the Herb Wiedoeft orchestra.

Wiedoeft died in a car accident in Medford, Oregon, on 12 May 1928, when his car skidded off the Medford-Klamath Falls highway. The trombonist Jesse Stafford took over the band, and released another 13 sides on Brunswick records under the name of the Jesse Stafford Orchestra.

Discography
A partial list of Brunswick recordings:

Works

References

Bibliography for references

External links
Herb Wiedoeft's Cinderella Roof Orchestra at the Red Hot Jazz Archive

1886 births
1928 deaths
American jazz trumpeters
Big band bandleaders
German emigrants to the United States
Road incident deaths in Oregon